Rhinocheilus is a genus of snakes, commonly called the long-nosed snakes, in the family Colubridae. The genus is native to the western United States and Mexico.

Species and subspecies
The genus Rhinocheilus contains the following species and subspecies which are recognized as being valid.
Rhinocheilus antonii 
Rhinocheilus etheridgei  – Etheridge's long-nosed snake
Rhinocheilus lecontei  – long-nosed snake
Rhinocheilus lecontei lecontei  – western long-nosed snake
Rhinocheilus lecontei tessellatus  – Texas long-nosed snake

References

Further reading
Baird SF, Girard C (1853). Catalogue of North American Reptiles in the Museum of the Smithsonian Institution. Part I.—Serpents. Washington, District of Columbia: Smithsonian Institution. xvi + 172 pp. (Rhinocheilus, new genus, p. 120).

 
Colubrids
Snake genera
Taxa named by Spencer Fullerton Baird
Taxa named by Charles Frédéric Girard